Ivaylo Kirilov (born 16 November 1975) is a Bulgarian former footballer.

References

1975 births
Living people
Bulgarian footballers
PFC Marek Dupnitsa players
Anagennisi Deryneia FC players
FC Dunav Ruse players
First Professional Football League (Bulgaria) players
Expatriate footballers in Cyprus
Association football midfielders
Sportspeople from Ruse, Bulgaria